Spanish singer Rosalía's music career began in 2013 when she contributed vocals to the cast of many musicals in her native Barcelona. She then went to contribute to the soundtrack albums of many benefic organisations, albums for children and commercials for different brands. In 2009 Rosalía entered the Taller de Músics in Barcelona and started to study music in general. In 2011 she went to college at the Catalonia College of Music where she specialized in flamenco music and worked as a teacher. In 2013 she took part of the Panama International Film Festival, performed at the Association of Performing Arts Professionals Conference in New York City and in some of La Fura dels Baus' shows in Singapore, between others. In 2014 she sang a song on the children album "Flamenco Kids en el Jalintro". Rosalía then worked with Desigual on their jingle "Last Night Was Eterenal" and started making friends in the music industry like Yung Beef, Raül Refree and C. Tangana. After falling in love with the last one, they released their collaboration "Antes de Morirme" in June 2016, which reached its popularity peak in the Fall of 2018 after it was included in the soundtrack of the Netflix show "Élite". This marks the first formal single by both of the performers.

Her debut album, Los Ángeles, was released in February 2017. It was preceded by the release of the first single, a pure flamenco song called "Catalina" featuring guitar chords by Refree, who co-produced the whole album alongside Rosalía. The song did not enter any chart. Follow-up singles included "De Plata" and "Aunque Es de Noche", which is a musical adaptation of the San Juan de la Cruz poem "Qué bien sé yo la fonte". The album was released through Universal Music but was only licensed, which means Rosalía did not ever sign a contract with the label. That same year she collaborated with Spanish hip hop artist Cálido Lehamo on his track "Con la Peña" and with Dj Swet on "Restu".

Rosalía's second studio album, El Mal Querer, co-produced by El Guincho, was recorded between May and July 2017 and presented as her bachelor's degree project, graduating from flamenco studies with honors. The album narrates the story of the 13th-century Occitan novel "Flamenca". It was released in November 2018 and was received as a "musical masterpiece" by many critics but, at the same time, very criticized by the Romani people in Spain, who accused Rosalía of self-apropiating flamenco music and Andualusian and Romani culture through her music, lyrics, lifestyle and image. This main controversy has been object of multiple studies about cultural appropriation worldwide. Its lead single, "Malamente" featured innovative elements in new flamenco music by mixing pop and hip hop with this old musical art. "Pienso en tu Mirá", its second single, followed the steps of the previous one but in a more smooth, liquid way. "Di Mi Nombre" and "Bagdad" were the last singles that the record spawned. The last one got the approval of Justin Timberlake to sample his song "Cry Me a River". In May 2018 Rosalía collaborated with Colombian reggaeton artist J Balvin on his track "Brillo" and "En Mí (Interlude)" even though she was not credited for the last one. She also took part of Niña Pastori's live album "Realmente Volando", recorded during her show at the iconic Teatro Real in Madrid. In June she sang the theme song for the second season of Spanish Netflix show Paquita Salas. In mid-2018 Rosalía signed a contract with Sony Music. She also worked alongside Pharrell Williams on a still unreleased track titled "De Madrugá", which has been performed live several times.

In 2019, Rosalía released five own singles as part of a droplet era and collaborated in many albums and signed a record deal with Columbia Records. To start she collaborated on James Blake's Assume Form album on the track "Barefoot in the Park", marking this as the first song in Rosalía's repertoire that in where she sings in English. Then, in April, she collaborated with Peruvian rapper Alejandro Chal on "Me Traicionaste", which was included in the Game of Thrones Final Season soundtrack. In March she released her second collaboration with Balvin, titled "Con Altura", which became her first worldwide hit, topping the charts in Spain, Argentina and many other countries. The song was written by the performers alongside Teo Halm, Frank Dukes and El Guincho, with the two last producing the track. In May her highly anticipated track "Aute Cuture", which she recorded back in November 2017 alongside El Guincho dropped. In July, her first ever song in Catalan "Milionària" was released to the public without any prior announcement. In August her collaboration with Ozuna "Yo x ti, Tu x mi" was released and performed at the MTV Video Music Awards. The track was included in the FIFA 20 videogame soundtrack. In November she released an experimental glitch pop song titled "A Palé", written and produced by her habitual studio crew alongside Noah Goldstein. A remix of the song by Gesaffelstein was released in January 2020 and another one by Overmono in April. In December she collaborated with Travis Scott and Lil Baby on the "Highest in the Room" remix.

Rosalía's third studio album, Motomami, was released in March 2022. Work for the album began and continued throughout 2019 and 2020, specially during international lockdown. "La Fama", which features The Weeknd, is scheduled to be its lead single. The track, released in November 2021, was preceded by two independent releases: "Juro Que" and "Dolerme". The first one is the musical end of "El Mal Querer", closing the story/era definitely while "Dolerme" was a gift to her fans and a "musical cure" to quarantine.

Songs

Unreleased songs

See also 

 Rosalía discography

References 

Rosalia